Chester—St. Margaret's is a provincial electoral district in  Nova Scotia, Canada, that elects one member of the Nova Scotia House of Assembly.  It is located on the South Shore.

The constituency was created in 1956 as a division of Lunenburg County. It was called Lunenburg East from 1956 to 1993. In 1993, the district was renamed Chester—St. Margaret's and gained Tancook Islands from Lunenburg Centre and St. Margaret's Bay from Halifax St. Margarets. In 2003, it gained the communities of West Dover and Bayside. In 2012, the district lost the Upper Tantallon area north of Highway 103 to Hammonds Plains-Lucasville.

The district includes the Municipality of Chester and the communities in the Halifax Regional Municipality along the coast of St. Margarets Bay including Peggys Cove. Major towns in the riding include Hubbards, Chester, Western Shore, Boutiliers Point and Head of St. Margarets Bay.

Geography

Statistics 
Avg. Income: $27,440 (2003) 
Population: 19,720 (2003) 
Post-secondary education: 36% (2003)

Members of the Legislative Assembly
This riding has elected the following Members of the Legislative Assembly:

Election results

1956 general election

1960 general election

1963 general election

1967 general election

1970 general election

1974 general election

1978 general election

1981 general election

1984 general election

1988 general election

1993 general election

1998 general election

1999 general election

2003 general election

2005 by-election

|-
 
|Progressive Conservative
|Judy Streatch
|align="right"|2,955
|align="right"|36.18
|align="right"|-1.15
|-
 
|Liberal
|Rick Fraughton
|align="right"|2,548
|align="right"|31.20
|align="right"|+6.95
|-
 
|New Democratic Party
|Hinrich Bitter-Suermann
|align="right"|2,434
|align="right"|29.80
|align="right"|-7.10
|-

|}

2006 general election

2009 general election

2013 general election

|-
 
|New Democratic Party
|Denise Peterson-Rafuse
|align="right"|3,341 
|align="right"|35.25 
|align="right"|-12.84
|-
 
|Progressive Conservative
|Janet Elizabeth Irwin
|align="right"|3,193 
|align="right"|33.69 
|align="right"|+6.22
|-
 
|Liberal
|Timothy Whitman Harris 
|align="right"|2,943 
|align="right"|31.06 
|align="right"|+9.95
|}

2017 general election

2021 general election

References

External links 
 cbc riding profile
 riding map
Chester-St.Margaret's June 21, 2005 By-Election Poll-by-Poll Results
June 13, 2006 Nova Scotia Provincial General Election Poll by Poll Results

Nova Scotia provincial electoral districts